Schweighart is a German surname. Notable people with the surname include:

Gerald Schweighart (1938–2022), former Mayor of Champaign, Illinois, U.S.
Imelda Schweighart (born 1995), German-Filipino model, singer-songwriter, composer and actress

German-language surnames